Sapa-Sapa, officially the Municipality of Sapa-Sapa,  is a 3rd class municipality in the province of Tawi-Tawi, Philippines. According to the 2020 census, it has a population of 33,580.

Geography

Barangays
Sapa-sapa is politically subdivided into 23 barangays.

Panampangan Island
Panampangan Island is located in the municipality of Sapa-sapa. The island itself is famous for its sandbar which is considered the longest in the Philippines.

At low tide, the sandbar connects to the nearby islet of Panampangan island.

Climate

Demographics

Economy

References

External links
Sapa-Sapa Profile at PhilAtlas.com
[ Philippine Standard Geographic Code]
Sapa-Sapa Profile at the DTI Cities and Municipalities Competitive Index
Philippine Census Information

Municipalities of Tawi-Tawi